Col de Méraillet (el. 1605 m) is a high mountain pass in the Alps in the department of Savoie in France ; it belongs to the commune of Beaufort.

It is traversed by the D 925 road, which also crosses the Cormet de Roselend.

References

See also
 List of highest paved roads in Europe
 List of mountain passes

Mountain passes of Auvergne-Rhône-Alpes
Mountain passes of the Alps